The 1921–22 Scottish Division One season was won by Celtic by one point over nearest rival Rangers. Dumbarton, Queen's Park and Clydebank finished 20th and 21st and 22nd respectively and were relegated to the 1922–23 Scottish Division Two.

League table

Results

References

Scottish Football Archive

1921–22 Scottish Football League
Scottish Division One seasons